MUBII-TB-DB is a database that focuses on tuberculosis antibiotic resistance genes. It is a highly structured, text-based database focusing on Mycobacterium tuberculosis at seven different mutation loci: rpoB, pncA, katG; mabA(fabG1)-inhA, gyrA, gyrB, and rrs. MUBII analyzes the query using two parallel strategies: 1). A BLAST search against previously mutated sequences.  2). Alignment of query sequences with wild-type sequences. MUBII outputs graphs of alignments and description of the mutation and therapeutic significance. Therapeutically relevant mutations are tagged as "High-Confident" based on the criteria set by Sandgren et al. MUBII-TB-DB provides a platform that is easy to use for even users that are not trained in bioinformatics.

See also 
 Antimicrobial Resistance databases

References 

Tuberculosis
Antimicrobial resistance organizations
Biological databases